Monica Toth (born 7 March 1970) is a retired Romanian triple jumper.

Achievements

References

1970 births
Living people
Romanian female triple jumpers
Universiade medalists in athletics (track and field)
Universiade bronze medalists for Romania
Medalists at the 1993 Summer Universiade